Acusta is a genus of air-breathing land snails, terrestrial pulmonate gastropod molluscs in the subfamily Bradybaeninae of the family Camaenidae.

Species
Species within the genus Acusta include:
 Acusta assimilis (H. Adams, 1866)
 Acusta despecta (G. B. Sowerby I, 1839)
 Acusta lineolata (Möllendorff, 1875)
 Acusta ravida (Benson, 1842)
 Acusta redfieldi (L. Pfeiffer, 1852)
 Acusta rhodostoma (Möllendorff, 1884)
 Acusta sieboldtiana (L. Pfeiffer, 1850)
 Acusta tourannensis (Souleyet, 1852)
 Acusta toyenmongaiensis Rolle, 1911
Species brought into synonymy
 Acusta frilleyi (Crosse & Debeaux, 1863): synonym of Acusta ravida frilleyi  (Crosse & Debeaux, 1863) (unaccepted rank)
 Acusta kikaiensis (Pilsbry, 1902): synonym of Acusta despecta kikaiensis (Pilsbry, 1902)
 Acusta laeta (Gould, 1859): synonym of Ezohelix gainesi (Pilsbry, 1900) (junior synonym)

References

 Bank, R. A. (2017). Classification of the Recent terrestrial Gastropoda of the World. Last update: July 16th, 2017

External links 
 Albers, J. C.; Martens, E. von. (1860). Die Heliceen nach natürlicher Verwandtschaft systematisch geordnet von Joh. Christ. Albers. Ed. 2. Pp. i-xviii, 1-359. Leipzig: Engelman

Camaenidae
Gastropod genera